Bahmanyar-e Gharbi (also Romanized as Bahmanyār-e Gharbī; also known as Bahman Yāri, Bahmanyārī-ye Gharbī, Bahmanyārī-ye Pā’īn, Bahmiyari Gharbi, and Behyārī-ye Gharbī) is a village in Hayat Davud Rural District, in the Central District of Ganaveh County, Bushehr Province, Iran. At the 2006 census, its population was 91, in 22 families.

References 

Populated places in Ganaveh County